The 2021 Texas Longhorns baseball team represented the University of Texas at Austin during the 2021 NCAA Division I baseball season. 
The Longhorns played their home games at UFCU Disch–Falk Field as a member of the Big 12 Conference. 
They were led by head coach David Pierce, in his fifth season at Texas.

Personnel

Roster

Coaches

Starters

Offseason departures

Players

Transfers

Outgoing

2020 MLB Draft

Schedule and results
{| class="toccolours" width=95% style="margin:1.5em auto; text-align:center;"
|-style=""
! colspan=2|2021 Texas Longhorns Baseball Game Log
|-
! colspan=2 | Legend:       = Win       = Loss       = Canceled      Bold = Texas team member
|-style=""
! colspan=2 |Regular Season (40–13)
|- valign="top" 
|

|-
|

|-
|

|-
|

|-style=""
! colspan=2 |Postseason (10–4)
|- valign="top" 
|

|-
|

|-
|

|-
|

|- 
| * indicates a non-conference game. All rankings from D1Baseball on the date of the contest.
|}

Postseason

Big 12 tournament

NCAA tournament

Austin Super Regional

College World Series

Awards and honors

National Awards 
All-Americans

College World Series

ABCA Regional Coach of the year

D1Baseball Assistant of the year

Big 12 Conference Awards 
First Team Big 12 All-Conference

Big 12 All-Tournament Team

Big 12 Conference Pitcher of the year

Big 12 Conference Manager of the year

Player statistics

Batting 

Note: No. = Number; G = Games played; AB = At bats; H = Hits; Avg. = Batting average; HR = Home runs; RBI = Runs batted in

Note: Gold Highlight = Team Leader

Note: leaders must meet the minimum requirement of 2 PA/G and 75% of games played

Pitching
Note: leaders must meet the minimum requirement of 1 IP/G

Rankings

Notes

References

Texas Longhorns
Texas Longhorns baseball seasons
Texas Longhorns Baseball
Texas
College World Series seasons